"All the King's Horses" is a song by The Firm from the album Mean Business, released as a single in 1986.

In the United States, the single spent four weeks at No. 1 on the Billboard Album Rock Tracks chart, reached No. 61 on the Billboard Hot 100 and No. 67 on the Cash Box Top 100 Singles chart. When it was released on an EP, the other side had the song, "Fortune Hunter". It was released in the US three times, in the UK once, and in Spain once.

References

The Firm - All The King's Horses at Discogs

1986 singles
The Firm (rock band) songs
Song recordings produced by Jimmy Page
Songs written by Paul Rodgers
1986 songs
Atlantic Records singles